Glen Andrew James Southam (born 10 June 1980) is a former English semi-professional footballer.

At international level, he has represented the England semi-professional side on 13 occasions, scoring two goals.

Career
Southam began his career as a non-contract player at Fulham whilst also playing for Enfield, and also in Sunday league football for Edmonton Rovers. He signed for Bishop's Stortford for the 1999–2000 season and during his time at the club, he was awarded the Player of the Season award three times in 2000–01, 2002–03 and 2003–04. He then suffered a serious injury and was loaned to Boreham Wood to aid his recovery.

He moved to Dagenham & Redbridge in May 2004 for a £20,000 fee – a club record for Bishop's Stortford –  and was part of their side that won promotion to the Football League in 2007. He made his Football League debut on 11 August 2007, in Dagenham's first ever Football League game, a 1–0 defeat away to Stockport County.

On 11 May 2009, Southam was released by Dagenham and Redbridge after agreeing a mutual departure with manager John Still.

Southam signed for League Two side Hereford United on 22 June 2009, he made six league appearances before leaving by mutual consent on 23 October, returning to former club Bishop's Stortford.

On deadline day in the January 2010 transfer window, he joined Conference National club Histon on an 18-month contract. However, amidst financial trouble, Southam agreed a mutual termination of his contract at Histon at the end of the 2009–10 season. Southam joined Barnet in June 2010. He made his debut on the opening day of the 2010–11 season in a 2–1 loss at Chesterfield and scored his first goal for the club from the penalty spot in a 2–2 draw at Morecambe on 25 September 2010. He left Barnet at the end of the 2010–11 season.

In August 2011, he joined Dover Athletic on a one-year contract. At the end of his contract in May 2012, Southam left Dover, signing for fellow Conference South side Eastleigh.

After skippering the Spitfires to promotion, Southam left Eastleigh on 3 July 2014 and joined Conference South side Chelmsford City a week later, before signing for Basingstoke Town on dual registration terms with Farnborough.

Southam was released by Basingstoke Town in April 2016,
signing for Brighton-based National League South side Whitehawk in September 2016, to play under his former manager at Eastleigh, Richard Hill   Southam joined Farnborough for the 2017–18 season.

International career
Southam made 13 appearances for England C between 2004 and 2007, including playing for England in the Home Nations Non-League International Tournaments in both 2004 and 2007, all located at several Scottish Highland Football League grounds across the North of Scotland.

Honours
Dagenham & Redbridge
Conference National: 2006–07
Eastleigh
Conference South: 2013–2014

References

External links
Dagenham & Redbridge profile

1980 births
Living people
English footballers
England semi-pro international footballers
Association football midfielders
Enfield F.C. players
Bishop's Stortford F.C. players
Boreham Wood F.C. players
Dagenham & Redbridge F.C. players
Hereford United F.C. players
Histon F.C. players
Barnet F.C. players
Dover Athletic F.C. players
Eastleigh F.C. players
Chelmsford City F.C. players
Sutton United F.C. players
Farnborough F.C. players
Basingstoke Town F.C. players
Whitehawk F.C. players
National League (English football) players
English Football League players
Isthmian League players
East Thurrock United F.C. players